Vientiane Mai is a Lao language  newspaper published by the Government of Laos in the capital and largest city of Vientiane. It was originally called the Vientiane Post, but was renamed in 1975 when the Lao People's Revolutionary Party (LPRP) took power. It reflects the position of the government and the LPRP.

References

Newspapers published in Laos
Weekly newspapers
Vientiane